The Holtermanniales are an order in the fungal class Tremellomycetes. The order contains two genera. Species of Holtermannia produce groups of horn-like gelatinous basidiocarps (fruit bodies) on wood and have associated yeast states. Species of Holtermaniella are only known as yeasts.

References

Tremellomycetes
Basidiomycota orders